

The Aéro Services Guépard Guépy is a French two-seat microlight cabin monoplane designed and built by Aéro Services Guépard to meet the FAI Microlight standard, it is also sold as a kit of parts for amateur construction.

The Guépy is a smaller variant of the Guépard 912 and is a cabin monoplane with a braced high-mounted wing, it has a fixed tricycle landing gear and an enclosed cabin for two sitting in side-by-side configuration. The Guépy is built from welded steel tube with tubular wing spars and aluminium ribs, the Club variant has a fabric covered wing. Although capable of using a range of engines a  Jabiru 2200 four-stroke or a  Rotax 582 two-stroke powerplant is normally used.

Specifications (Guépy Super)

References

Notes

Bibliography

External links
 

2000s French civil utility aircraft
Homebuilt aircraft
Guépy